Frederic Francis Flach (25 January 1927 – 26 September 2006) was a psychiatrist and author. He graduated from Cornell University Medical College where he served as Adjunct Associate Professor of Psychiatry. He was an attending psychiatrist at the Payne Whitney Clinic (New York Hospital) and at St. Vincent's Hospital and Medical Center. Frederic died in 2006.

Awards and honors
In 1996, he was awarded the Maxine Mason Award by the National Alliance on Mental Illness (NAMI). He was a Knight Commander of the Equestrian Order of the Holy Sepulchre of Jerusalem (Catholic).

Books
The Secret Strength of Depression
Putting the Pieces Together Again
A New Marriage, A New Life
The Secret Strength of Angels
Faith, Healing and Miracles
Resilience
Rickie
Fridericus

External links
The Frederic Flach, MD Angel Fund at the Hatherleigh Foundation.

1927 births
2006 deaths
American psychiatrists
American male writers
Weill Cornell Medical College alumni
Cornell University faculty
Place of death missing
Knights of the Holy Sepulchre